Bolshiye Lipki is a rural locality (a village) in Gorod Vyazniki, Vyaznikovsky District, Vladimir Oblast, Russia. The population was 220 as of 2010. There are 2 streets.

Geography 
Bolshiye Lipki is located 7 km northwest of Vyazniki (the district's administrative centre) by road. Malye Lipki is the nearest rural locality.

References 

Rural localities in Vyaznikovsky District